Hauksdóttir is an Icelandic patronymic, literally meaning "daughter of Hauk". Notable people with the name include:

Gunnhildur Hauksdóttir (born 1972), Icelandic artist
Hrafnhildur Hauksdóttir (born 1996), Icelandic footballer
Vigdís Hauksdóttir (born 1965), Icelandic politician

Icelandic-language surnames